Zhang Jinliang (born 23 January 1999) is a Chinese footballer currently playing as a defender for Guangzhou R&F.

Club career
Zhang Jinliang was promoted to the senior team of Guangzhou R&F within the 2020 Chinese Super League season and would make his debut in a Chinese FA Cup game on 18 September 2020 against Shanghai Shenhua in a 1-1 draw that was eventually won on penalty's.

Career statistics

References

External links

1999 births
Living people
Chinese footballers
Association football defenders
Guangzhou City F.C. players